This is the list of the heads of state of Russia after the monarchy had been abolished in 1917.

Russian Republic (1917–1918)
With the abdication of Emperor Nicholas II after the February Revolution of 1917, power in Russia passed to the Provisional Government formed by the liberal leadership of the Duma. Grand Duke Michael had refused to ascend to his older brother's throne without the consent of an elected Constituent Assembly, and it was broadly assumed that the Assembly would be the only body with the authority to change the form of government. However, after a failed coup attempt against the government, the Russian Republic was proclaimed by Minister-President Kerensky. The election was scheduled for  November 1917, yet when it finally took place, the power in the capital city of Petrograd had already switched to the Bolshevik revolutionaries. By that time, the government had been de facto dissolved, and the newly elected Assembly was also disbanded after its very first session by the Bolsheviks on 19 January 1918.

Russian Civil War (1917–1923)
The October Revolution sparked a civil war across the former Russian Empire, with the most prominent factions being the Bolsheviks, loosely connected anti-Bolshevik governments and armies known as the White movement, as well as numerous independence movements loosely aligned with the Whites.

Russian Soviet Republic (1917–1922) 
The Bolsheviks used the name Russian Republic immediately after the revolution, but the dismissal of the Constituent Assembly broke any ties between them and the previous government, and the name Russian Socialist Federative Soviet Republic had been adopted in their 1918 constitution. Formally, the head of state was the Chairman of the All-Russian Central Executive Committee, but de facto the Bolshevik-controlled area was headed by Vladimir Lenin as the leader of the Party and Chairman of the Council of People's Commissars.

Russian State (1918–1923) 
Various anti-Bolshevik governments began to form across Russia since early 1918, initially emerging among the cossacks of Don and Kuban. In September 1918, the largest factions united into the Provisional All-Russian Government, creating the Russian State. Two months later, Admiral Alexander Kolchak headed the Russian State as a Supreme Ruler. After Kolchak's defeat in 1920, the White movement started to decline, with most of its members leaving Russia in November 1920 under the command of General Pyotr Wrangel. Various social-democratic governments continued to function until June 1923, when the Bolsheviks suppressed the Yakut revolt in Priamurye.

In of the Soviet Union (1922–1991)

On 30 December 1922, the Russian Soviet Republic, along with the Soviet pro-Bolshevik republics of Ukraine, Belarus and the Southern Caucasus were merged into the Soviet Union, with the Russian SFSR authorities holding the authority of the highly centralized country, which was governed by a leader of the Communist Party (informally known as Vozhd) or a collective leadership (Politburo). In 1938, the Supreme Soviet of the RSFSR was formed. Following the adoption of amendments to the Constitution in 1989, the office of Chairman of the Presidium was removed, and the position of the Russian head of state passed directly to the Chairman of the Supreme Soviet in May 1990.

Russian Federation (since 1991)
On 17 March 1991, the all-Russian referendum on the introduction of presidency was held. More than 70% of citizens voted for the introduction of the office. On 12 June, Boris Yeltsin won 57% of the popular vote in the first democratic presidential election. Yeltsin's inauguration took place on 10 July. On 12 December, Russia ratified the Belovezh Accords, thus dissolving the Soviet Union. On 25 December, the Russian Soviet Federative Socialist Republic was renamed Russian Federation via a presidential decree, with the names of the state and its highest executive office constitutionally amended in 1992. The office got its current status with the adoption of a new constitution in 1993, following an armed dispute between the president and the parliament.

Heads of state of Russia
Russia
Heads of state